Dunkleosteus is an extinct genus of large arthrodire fish that existed during the Late Devonian period, about 382–358 million years ago. It consists of ten species, some of which are among the largest placoderms to have ever lived: D. terrelli, D. belgicus, D. denisoni, D. marsaisi, D. magnificus, D. missouriensis, D. newberryi, D. amblyodoratus, and D. raveri, and the largest and most well known species is D. terrelli. Numerous fossils of the various species have been found in North America, Poland, Belgium, and Morocco. Dunkleosteus was a pelagic fish inhabiting open waters, and an apex predator of its ecosystem.

Discovery
The largest collection of Dunkleosteus fossils in the world is housed at the Cleveland Museum of Natural History, with smaller collections (in descending order of size) held at the American Museum of Natural History, Smithsonian National Museum of Natural History, Yale Peabody Museum, the Natural History Museum in London, and the Cincinnati Museum Center. Specimens of Dunkleosteus are on display in many museums throughout the world (see table below), most of which are casts of the same specimen: CMNH 5768, the largest well-preserved individual of D. terrelli,. The original CMNH 5768 is on display in the Cleveland Museum of Natural History.

Taxonomy
Dunkleosteus was named in 1956 to honour David Dunkle (1911–1982), former curator of vertebrate paleontology at the Cleveland Museum of Natural History. The genus name Dunkleosteus combines David Dunkle's surname with the Greek word  ( 'bone'), literally meaning 'Dunkle's-bone'. The type species D. terrelli was originally described in 1873 as a species of Dinichthys, its specific epithet chosen in honor of Jay Terrell, the fossil's discoverer.

Originally thought to be a member of the genus Dinichthys, Dunkleosteus was later recognized as belonging to its own genus in 1956. It was thought to be closely related to Dinichthys, and they were grouped together in the family Dinichthyidae. However, in the 2010 Carr & Hlavin phylogenetic study, Dunkleosteus and Dinichthys were found to belong to two separate clades. Carr & Hlavin resurrected the family Dunkleosteidae and placed Dunkleosteus, Eastmanosteus, and a few other genera from Dinichthyidae within it. Dinichthyidae, in turn, is left a monospecific family.
 
The cladogram below from the 2013 Zhu & Zhu study shows the placement of Dunkleosteus within Dunkleosteidae and Dinichthys within the separate clade Aspinothoracidi:

Alternatively, the subsequent 2016 Zhu et al. study using a larger morphological dataset recovered Panxiosteidae well outside of Dunkleosteoidea, leaving the status of Dunkleosteidae as a clade grouping separate from Dunkleosteoidea in doubt, as shown in the cladogram below:

Species 
At least ten different species of Dunkleosteus have been described so far.

It has a rounded snout. D. terrelli fossil remains are found in Upper Frasnian to Upper Famennian Late Devonian strata of the United States (Huron and Cleveland Shale of Ohio, the Conneaut of Pennsylvania, Chattanooga Shale of Tennessee, Lost Burro Formation, California, and possibly Ives breccia of Texas) and Europe.

D. belgicus (?) is known from fragments described from the Famennian of Belgium. The median dorsal plate is characteristic of the genus, but, a plate that was described as a suborbital is anterolateral.

D. denisoni is known from a small median dorsal plate, typical in appearance for Dunkleosteus, but much smaller than normal. It is comparable in skull structure to D. marsaisi.

D. marsaisi refers to the Dunkleosteus fossils from the Lower Famennian Late Devonian strata of the Atlas Mountains in Morocco. In D. marsaisi, the snout is narrower, and a postpineal fenestra may be present. Many researchers and authorities consider it a synonym of D. terrelli. H. Schultze regards D. marsaisi as a member of Eastmanosteus.

D. magnificus is a large placoderm from the Frasnian Rhinestreet Shale of New York. It was originally described as Dinichthys magnificus by Hussakof and Bryant in 1919, then as " Dinichthys mirabilis" by Heintz in 1932. Dunkle and Lane moved it to Dunkleosteus in 1971.

D. missouriensis is known from fragments from Frasnian Missouri. Dunkle and Lane regard them as being very similar to D. terrelli.

D. amblyodoratus is known from some fragmentary remains from Late Devonian strata of Kettle Point Formation, Ontario. The species name means 'blunt spear' and refers to the way the nuchal and paranuchal plates in the back of the head form the shape of a blunted spearhead.

D. raveri is a small species, possibly 1 meter long, known from an uncrushed skull roof found in a carbonate concretion from near the bottom of the Huron Shale, of the Famennian Ohio Shale strata. Besides its small size, it had comparatively large eyes. Because D. raveri was found in the strata directly below the strata where the remains of D. terrelli are found, D. raveri may have given rise to D. terrelli. The species name commemorates Clarence Raver of Wakeman, Ohio, who discovered the concretion where the holotype was found.

Description

Size and general build

Mainly the armored frontal sections of specimens have been fossilized, and consequently, the appearance of the other portions of the fish is mostly unknown. In fact, only about 5% of Dunkleosteus specimens have more than a quarter of their skeleton preserved. Because of this, many reconstructions of the hindquarters are often based on fossils of smaller arthrodires, such as Coccosteus, which have preserved hind sections, leading to widely varying size estimates.

However, an exceptionally preserved specimen of D. terrelli preserves ceratotrichia in a pectoral fin, implying that the fin morphology of placoderms was much more variable than previously thought, and was heavily influenced by locomotory requirements. This knowledge, coupled with the knowledge that fish morphology is more heavily influenced by feeding niche than phylogeny, allowed a 2017 study to infer the body shape of D. terrelli. This new reconstruction gives D. terrelli a much more shark-like profile, including a strong ventral lobe on its caudal fin, the caudal fin having a high aspect ratio, narrow caudal peduncle, and fusiform body, given it was a big pelagic animal, in contrast to reconstructions based on other placoderms.

Paleobiology

Diet
 
Dunkleosteus terrelli possessed a four-bar linkage mechanism for jaw opening that incorporated connections between the skull, the thoracic shield, the lower jaw and the jaw muscles joined together by movable joints. The pressures generated in those regions were high enough to puncture or cut through cuticle or dermal armor, suggesting that D. terrelli was adapted to prey on free-swimming, armored prey such as ammonites and other placoderms.

In addition, teeth of a chondrichthyan thought to belong to Orodus (Orodus spp.) were found in association with Dunkleosteus remains, suggesting that these were probably stomach contents regurgitated from the animal. Orodus is thought to be tachypelagic, or a fast-swimming pelagic fish. Thus, Dunkleosteus might have been fast enough to catch these fast organisms, and not a slow swimmer like originally thought. Fossils of Dunkleosteus are frequently found with boluses of fish bones, semidigested and partially eaten remains of other fish. As a result, the fossil record indicates it may have routinely regurgitated prey bones rather than digest them. Mature individuals probably inhabited deep sea locations, like other Placoderms, living in shallow waters during adolescence.

Reproduction
Dunkleosteus, together with most other placoderms, may have also been among the first vertebrates to internalize egg fertilization, as seen in some modern sharks. Some other placoderms have been found with evidence that they may have been viviparous, including what appears to have been an umbilical cord.

Growth

Morphological studies on the lower jaws of juveniles of D. terrelli reveal they were proportionally as robust as those of adults, indicating they already could produce high bite forces and likely were able to shear into resistant prey tissue similar to adults, albeit on a smaller scale. This pattern is in direct contrast to the condition common in tetrapods in which the jaws of juveniles are more gracile than in adults.

See also
 List of placoderms

References

Further reading

External links

 Introduction to the Placodermi: Extinct Armored Fishes with Jaws. Waggoner, Ben (2000). Retrieved Aug 1, 2005
 MSNBC: Prehistoric fish packed a mean bite
 BBC: Ancient 'Jaws' had monster bite

Dunkleosteidae
Apex predators
Placoderms of Africa
Fossils of Morocco
Placoderms of Europe
Fossils of Belgium
Placoderms of North America
Fossils of Canada
Paleontology in Missouri
Paleontology in Pennsylvania
Paleontology in Tennessee
Late Devonian first appearances
Late Devonian animals
Famennian extinctions
Fossil taxa described in 1956
Taxa named by John Strong Newberry